The 1951 Yugoslav Second League season was the 5th season of the Second Federal League, the second level association football competition of SFR Yugoslavia, since its establishment in 1946.

Teams
A total of sixteen teams contested the league, including six sides from the 1950 season, one club relegated from the 1950 Yugoslav First League and nine sides promoted from the third tier leagues played in the 1950 season. The league was contested in a double round robin format, with each club playing every other club twice, for a total of 30 rounds. Two points were awarded for a win and one point for draws.

Budućnost were relegated from the 1950 Yugoslav First League after finishing in the 10th place of the league table, while 9th placed Spartak Subotica were allowed to stay in the top level after Naša Krila Zemun were dissolved. The four clubs promoted directly to the second level were Dinamo Pančevo, Radnički Belgrade, Velež and NK Zagreb, while Bokelj, Proleter Zrenjanin, Rabotnički, Rudar Trbovlje and Tekstilac achieved this through qualifications. At the end of the season there were no teams relegated as the league changed its format.

League table

See also
1951 Yugoslav First League
1951 Yugoslav Cup

References

Yugoslav Second League seasons
Yugo
2
Yugo
2